Borama Airport  is an airport serving Borama,  the capital city of the Awdal region in Somaliland.  The airport is currently not in use, but there are plans to resume operations in the future.

See also
 Somaliland
 List of airports in Somalia

References

External links
 
 Aeronautical chart at SkyVector

Airports in Somaliland
Awdal